Brian Albert Wetheridge (born 13 January 1953), is a male former diver who competed for Great Britain and England. Wetheridge represented Great Britain in the men's 10 metre platform at the 1972 Summer Olympics.

He also represented England in the 10 metres platform, at the 1970 British Commonwealth Games in Edinburgh, Scotland.

References

1953 births
English male divers
Divers at the 1972 Summer Olympics
Olympic divers of Great Britain
Living people
Divers at the 1970 British Commonwealth Games
Commonwealth Games competitors for England